Douna is a department or commune of Léraba Province in south-western  Burkina Faso. Its capital lies at the town of Douna. According to the 1996 census the department has a total population of 9,132.

Towns and villages

 Douna (4 249 inhabitants) (capital)
 Niofila	(1 980 inhabitants)
 Manema	(1 155 inhabitants)
 Monsona	(1 101 inhabitants)
 Sabaribougou	(334 inhabitants)
 Tassona	(313 inhabitants)

References

Departments of Burkina Faso
Léraba Province